Eudemis centritis is a moth of the family Tortricidae. It is found in India and Vietnam.

Adults are brown sprinkled with blackish dots and unusual markings.

References

Moths described in 1912
Olethreutini